Sthenoteuthis is a genus of small squids, with two species, part of the subfamily Ommastrephinae within the family Ommastrephidae, the "flying squids". They are the dominant species of flying squid in the world's tropical and subtropical seas and they are commonly seen at the ocean's surface during the night. Their size ranges from mantle lengths of 100 mm to 600 mm.

Species
There are two species in the genus Sthenoteuthis:

Sthenoteuthis oualaniensis (Lesson, 1830)
Sthenoteuthis pteropus (Steenstrup, 1855)

References

Squid
Cephalopod genera